Broken Lullaby (a.k.a. The Man I Killed) is a 1932 American pre-Code drama film directed by Ernst Lubitsch and released by Paramount Pictures. The screenplay by Samson Raphaelson and Ernest Vajda is based on the 1930 play L'homme que j'ai tué by Maurice Rostand and its 1931 English-language adaptation, The Man I Killed, by Reginald Berkeley.

Plot

Haunted by the memory of Walter Holderlin, a soldier he killed during World War I, French musician Paul Renard (Phillips Holmes) confesses to a priest (Frank Sheridan), who grants him absolution. Using the address on a letter he found on the dead man's body, Paul then travels to Germany to find his family.

As anti-French sentiment continues to permeate Germany, Dr. Holderlin (Lionel Barrymore) initially refuses to welcome Paul into his home, but changes his mind when his son's fiancée Elsa identifies him as the man who has been leaving flowers on Walter's grave. Rather than reveal the real connection between them, Paul tells the Holderlin family he was a friend of their son, who attended the same musical conservatory he did.

Although the hostile townspeople and local gossips disapprove, the Holderlins befriend Paul, who finds himself falling in love with Elsa (Nancy Carroll). When she shows Paul her former fiancé's bedroom, he becomes distraught and tells her the truth. She convinces him not to confess to Walter's parents, who have embraced him as their second son, and Paul agrees to forgo easing his conscience and stays with his adopted family. Dr. Holderlin presents Walter's violin to Paul, who plays it while Elsa accompanies him on the piano.

Cast
Lionel Barrymore as Dr H. Holderlin
Nancy Carroll as Fraulein Elsa, Walter's Fiancée
Phillips Holmes as Paul Renard
Louise Carter as Frau Holderlin
Lucien Littlefield as Herr Walter Schultz
ZaSu Pitts as Anna, Holderlin's Maid
Frank Sheridan as Priest
Emma Dunn as Frau Miller
George Irving as Townsman (uncredited)
Tully Marshall as Gravedigger (uncredited)

Production
The film's original title, The Man I Killed, was changed to The Fifth Commandment to avoid giving "wrong impressions in the minds of the public about the character of the story." It ultimately was released as Broken Lullaby.

The film was presented at the Venice International Film Festival. According to The Hollywood Reporter, Czechoslovakia banned the film due to its "pacifistic theme". It was screened at the 2006 San Sebastián International Film Festival as part of an Ernst Lubitsch retrospective.

Critical reception
Mordaunt Hall of The New York Times called the film "further evidence of Mr. Lubitsch's genius, for, while it is tearful, its story is unfurled in a poetic fashion, with an unexcelled performance by Lionel Barrymore and fine acting by Phillips Holmes and Nancy Carroll." He added, "Each sequence is fashioned with sincerity and great care. The different scenes are all photographed with admirable artistry ... The magic of the Lubitsch mind is not only reflected in the artistry of the production and the direction, but also in the habiliments of the players and their make-up."

Pauline Kael called Phillips Holmes "unspeakably handsome but an even more unspeakable actor," thought Nancy Carroll was "miserably miscast," and added, "Lubitsch can't entirely escape his own talent, and the film is beautifully crafted, but he mistook drab, sentimental hokum for ironic, poetic tragedy."

Time Out London said, "The acting is overwrought; the dialogue is uniformly on-the-nose. Yet 'purity' is the word that comes to mind: The movie is a nakedly sincere ode to the power of sympathy, and it's not to be missed."

Home media
The film has been released for the Region 2 market. It is in fullscreen format and has an audio track in English and subtitles in English and Spanish.

The film was also released in 2021 on Blu-ray by Kino Lorber, featuring an audio commentary by Joseph McBride.

Remake

A French remake entitled Frantz was released in 2016. The film was directed by François Ozon, co-written by Ozon and Philippe Piazzo, and stars Pierre Niney and Paula Beer among others.

References

External links
{{tcmdb title|id=69767|title=Broeken Lullaby

1932 films
American films based on plays
Films set in Germany
Films set in the 1910s
American black-and-white films
Films directed by Ernst Lubitsch
Paramount Pictures films
1932 drama films
American drama films
1930s American films